Ebenezer Okletey Terlabi (born September 3, 1963) is a Ghanaian politician and a former deputy Eastern Regional Minister of  Ghana. He was appointed by President John Evan Atta Mills and served till January 2013. He is currently the deputy Minister of Defense of Ghana.

Personal 
Terlabi is a Christian (Church of Pentecost). He is married with three children.

Early life and education 
Terlabi was born on September 3, 1963. He hails from Odumase-krobo, a town in the Eastern Region of Ghana. He entered Kwame Nkrumah University of Science and Technology and obtained his Master of Philosophy degree in biochemistry in 2000.

Politics 
Terlabi is a member of the National Democratic Congress (NDC). In 2012, he contested for the Lower Manya Krobo seat on the ticket of the NDC sixth parliament of the fourth republic and won.

Employment 
 Lecturer of Biochemistry
 Deputy Easter Regional Minister, 2011 – January 7, 2013

References

Living people
National Democratic Congress (Ghana) politicians
Pope John Senior High School and Minor Seminary alumni
Ghanaian MPs 2021–2025
1963 births